Thakore Saheb of Rajkot is an Indian princely title, in existence since 1620. Notable people holding the title include:

 Lakhajirajsinhji II Bavajirajsinhji (1885–1930), 12th Thakore Saheb, Indian nobleman and cricketer
 Pradyumansinhji Lakhajirajsinhji (1913–1973), 14th Thakore Saheb Indian nobleman and cricketer
 Manoharsinh P. Jadeja (1935–2018), 15th Thakore Saheb, Indian politician and cricketer

History of Rajkot
Indian surnames
Titles in India